Göğebakan (Turkish for "skygazer") is a Turkish surname formed by the combination of the Turkish words gök ("sky") and bakan ("onlooking").  Notable people with the name include:
 Emine Göğebakan (born 2001), Turkish taekwondo athlete
 Murat Göğebakan (1968–2014),  Turkish singer

References

Turkish-language surnames